Starting in the 1880s, the German Kaiserliche Marine (Imperial Navy) began building a series of cruisers. The first designs—protected and unprotected—were ordered to replace aging sail and steam-powered frigates and corvettes that were of minimal combat value. After several iterations of each type, these cruisers were developed into armored and light cruisers, respectively, over the following decade. They were built to fill a variety of roles, including scouts for the main battle fleet and colonial cruisers for Germany's overseas empire. The armored cruisers in turn led to the first German battlecruiser, .

The protected and unprotected cruisers had been withdrawn from active service by the 1910s, though some continued in secondary roles. Most of the armored and light cruisers saw action in World War I, in all of the major theaters of the conflict. Their service ranged from commerce raiding patrols on the open ocean to the fleet engagements in the North Sea such as the Battle of Jutland. Many were sunk in the course of the war, and the majority of the remainder were either seized as war prizes by the victorious Allies, scuttled by their crews in Scapa Flow in 1919, or broken up for scrap. The Treaty of Versailles forced Germany to surrender most of its remaining vessels. Only six old pre-dreadnought battleships and six old light cruisers could be kept on active duty.

In the 1920s, Germany began a modest program to rebuild its fleet, now renamed the Reichsmarine. A further five heavy cruisers—the —were ordered in the mid-1930s, though only the first three were completed. At the same time, the German navy was renamed the Kriegsmarine. Plan Z, a more ambitious reconstruction program that called for twelve P-class cruisers, was approved in early 1939 but was cancelled before the end of the year following the outbreak of World War II. Of the six heavy cruisers and six light cruisers that were finished, only two survived the war. One, was sunk following nuclear weapons tests during Operation Crossroads in 1946; the other, saw service in the Soviet Navy until she was scrapped around 1960.

Protected cruisers

Starting in the mid-1880s, the German Navy began to modernize its cruising force, which at that time relied on a mixed collection of sail and steam frigates and corvettes. General Leo von Caprivi, then the Chief of the Kaiserliche Marine (Imperial Navy), ordered several new warships, including two s laid down in 1886, the first protected cruisers to be built in Germany. Design work on their successor, began the following year, though she was not laid down until 1890. Five more ships of the  followed in the mid-1890s. These ships, the last protected cruisers built in Germany, provided the basis for the armored cruisers that were built starting at the end of the decade. All of these ships were intended to serve both as fleet scouts and overseas cruisers, since Germany's limited naval budget prevented development of ships optimized for each task.

Most of the German protected cruisers served on overseas stations throughout their careers, primarily in the East Asia Squadron in the 1890s and 1900s.  participated in the seizure of the Kiautschou Bay concession in November 1897, which was used as the primary base for the East Asia Squadron. Kaiserin Augusta, and  assisted in the suppression of the Boxer Uprising in China in 1900, and  saw action during the Venezuelan crisis of 1902–03, where she bombarded several Venezuelan fortresses. , Prinzess Wilhelm, and Kaiserin Augusta were relegated to secondary duties in the 1910s, while the Victoria Louise class was used to train naval cadets in the 1900s. All eight ships were broken up for scrap in the early 1920s.

Unprotected cruisers

At the same time that Caprivi began ordering new protected cruisers, he also authorized the construction of smaller unprotected cruisers for use in Germany's overseas colonies. A final, much larger vessel, was laid down in 1892; her design was based on contemporary protected cruisers like Kaiserin Augusta. She represented another attempt to merge the colonial cruiser and fleet scout, which was unsuccessful.

All nine cruisers served extensively in Germany's colonies, particularly in Africa and Asia. They participated in the suppression of numerous rebellions, including the Abushiri Revolt in German East Africa in 1889–1890, the Boxer Uprising in China in 1900–1901, and the Sokehs Rebellion in the Caroline Islands in 1911. Of the remaining seven ships, only  and  remained abroad at the start of World War I in August 1914. Cormoran was stationed in Tsingtao, but her engines were worn out, so she was scuttled to prevent her capture. Geier briefly operated against British shipping in the Pacific before running low on coal. She put into Hawaii, where she was interned by the US Navy. After the United States declared war on Germany in April 1917, she was seized and commissioned into American service as USS Schurz, though she was accidentally sunk in a collision in June 1918. , employed as a mine storage hulk in Wilhelmshaven during the war, was destroyed by an accidental explosion in 1917.

Armored cruisers

The first armored cruiser, was ordered shortly after the Victoria Louise class of protected cruisers. Fürst Bismarck was an improved version of the earlier type, with heavier armament, more extensive armor protection, and a significantly greater size. A further seven units, divided between four different designs, followed over the next ten years; each design provided incremental improvements over earlier vessels. A ninth armored cruiser, was a much larger vessel representing an intermediate step between armored cruisers and battlecruisers. Indeed, her design had been influenced by the misinformation Britain had released about its s, which were then under construction. Once the characteristics of the new ships were revealed, Germany began building battlecruisers in response.

Germany's armored cruisers served in a variety of roles, including overseas as flagships of the East Asia Squadron, and in the fleet reconnaissance forces. All of them, save Fürst Bismarck, saw action during World War I in a variety of theaters. Blücher served with the battlecruisers in the I Scouting Group and was sunk at the Battle of Dogger Bank in 1915, and the two s formed the core of Maximilian von Spee's squadron that defeated the British at the Battle of Coronel in November 1914 before being annihilated at the Battle of the Falkland Islands.  was accidentally sunk by a German mine in November 1914 outside Wilhelmshaven, and the two s were sunk in the Baltic Sea. Only  and  survived the war; both were scrapped in the early 1920s.

Light cruisers

Starting in the late 1890s, the Kaiserliche Marine began developing modern light cruisers, based on experience with the unprotected cruisers and a series of avisos it had built over the preceding decade. The ten-ship Gazelle class set the basic pattern, which was gradually improved over successive classes. The  introduced more powerful,  main guns, and the  added a waterline main belt to improve armor protection. Between 1897 and the end of World War I, the German Navy completed forty-seven light cruisers; all of these ships saw service during the war in a variety of theaters and roles. Several fleet cruiser design studies were prepared in 1916, but no work was begun before the war ended in November 1918.

Following the war, the Treaty of Versailles forced Germany to cede all of its most modern light cruisers; only eight Gazelle and s were permitted under the terms of the treaty. These ships could be replaced after twenty years from the time they were launched, and the first new vessel, was laid down in 1921. Five more ships of the Königsberg and es were built between 1926 and 1935. This left  as the only vessel of the type to survive the war. She was seized by the Soviet Union as a war prize and continued in Soviet service until she was scrapped in 1960.

Heavy cruisers

In addition to restricting the number of light cruisers Germany could possess, the Treaty of Versailles also limited the capital ship strength of the new Reichsmarine to six old pre-dreadnought battleships and placed restrictions on the size of replacement ships, with the intent of prohibiting ships more powerful than coastal defense ships from being built. If Britain and France agreed to abrogate the naval clauses of the Versailles treaty, Germany would abandon the new cruisers. Plan Z, approved in early 1939, projected a dozen P-class cruisers based on the Deutschland design.

In 1942 the Kriegsmarine decided to convert the Admiral Hipper-class cruiser  into an aircraft carrier, though the project was not completed. , renamed Lützow, and Prinz Eugen both survived the war; the former was sunk in Soviet weapons tests in 1947 and the latter sank after enduring two nuclear detonations in Operation Crossroads in 1946.

See also

 List of battleships of Germany
 List of battlecruisers of Germany
 List of ironclad warships of Germany

Notes
Footnotes

Citations

References
 
 
 
 
 
 
 
 
 
 
 
 
 
 
 
 
 
 
 
 
 
 

Germany
 
Cruiser